Tosi may refer to:

 Tosi (Nepal)

People 
 Adelaide Tosi (c. 1800–1859), Italian operatic soprano
 Arturo Tosi (1871–1956), Italian painter
 Christina Tosi (born 1981), chef and co-owner of Momofuku Milk Bar
 Eugenio Tosi (1864–1929), Italian Cardinal, archbishop of Milan
 Flavio Tosi (born 1969), Italian politician
 Flavio Tosi (American football) (1912–1994), American football end
 Franco Tosi (1850–1898), Italian engineer
 Giuseppe Felice Tosi (1619–c. 1693), Italian composer and organist
 Giuseppe Tosi (1916–1981), Italian athlete
 Laurence Tosi (born 1968), Founder/Managing Partner WestCap Group, former CFO Blackstone, Airbnb
 Luca Tosi (born 1992), San Marino international footballer
 Luigi Tosi (1915-2001), Italian actor
 Mao Tosi (born 1976), one of Alaska’s Top 40 Under 40
 Marcelo Tosi (born 1969), Brazilian equestrian
 Mario Tosi (born 1942), Italian-American cinematographer and cameraman
 Noël Tosi (born 1959), French football coach
 Pascal Tosi (1837–1897), Italian Jesuit, missionary and co-founder of the Alaska mission
 Pascal Tosi (director), French director and writer
 Pier Francesco Tosi (c. 1653–1732), Italian castrato singer and composer
 Piero Tosi (1927–2019), Italian costume designer
 Rodrigo Tosi (born 1983), Brazilian footballer
 Victor B. Tosi (born 1937), member of the Bronx Republican Party
 Virgilio Tosi (born 1925), Italian documentary filmmaker and film historian

Other 
 Franco Tosi Meccanica (FTM), Italian engineering business
 Cantieri navali Tosi di Taranto, "Tosi", an Italian shipbuilding company
 Tosi Agapi Pos Na Hathei, a 2002 album by Greek artist Natasa Theodoridou